Tomislav Brkić and Ante Pavić were the defending champions but chose not to defend their title.

Vít Kopřiva and Jiří Lehečka won the title after defeating Dustin Brown and Tristan-Samuel Weissborn 6–4, 6–0 in the final.

Seeds

Draw

References

External links
 Main draw

Aspria Tennis Cup - Doubles